Kanepi Parish is a rural municipality of Estonia, in Põlva County. The administrative centre is Kanepi.

It was created in 2017 with the merger of Valgjärve, Kõlleste, and Kanepi Parish.

Settlements

Small borough
Kanepi
Villages
Abissaare - Aiaste - Erastvere - Hauka - Heisri - Hino - Hurmi - Häätaru - Ihamaru - Jõgehara - Jõksi - Kaagna - Kaagvere - Karaski - Karilatsi - Karste - Koigera - Kooli - Kooraste - Krootuse - Krüüdneri - Lauri - Maaritsa - Magari - Mügra - Närapää - Palutaja - Peetrimõisa - Piigandi - Piigaste - Pikajärve - Pikareinu - Prangli - Puugi - Põlgaste - Rebaste - Saverna - Sirvaste - Soodoma - Sulaoja - Sõreste - Tiido - Tuulemäe - Tõdu - Valgjärve - Varbuse - Veski - Vissi - Voorepalu

Religion

Geography
The lakes Aalupi, Erastvere and Hüüdre are located in Kanepi Parish.

2018 Flag 
After the 2017 merger with Valgjärve and Kõlleste Parishes, the Kanepi Parish was looking for the new flag and coat of arms. As Kanep in Estonian means Cannabis in English, then there were also proposed versions of flag and coat of arms with the cannabis leaf in it. To see what is more popular among the people, the municipality published the seven finalist designs on a parish page where people could vote online for their favorite design. A cannabis leaf won the contest with an overwhelming majority of 12,000 votes, which is larger than the parish population of 5,000.

In May 2018, the city council, baffled by the ordeal, chose to vote for themselves if they wanted to officially adopt the proposed flag, with a slim majority of 9-8 voting to adopt the flag. On May 15, 2018, the municipality announced that the cannabis leaf flag will be the official flag of Kanepi, Andrus Seeme (Mayor) said, and on July 13, 2018, the flag was raised outside the Kanepi municipal building.

See also
Battle of Erastfer

References

External links